Éliane Manbolamo Bodolo (born 3 July 1991) is a Cameroonian footballer who plays as a centre back for Spanish Primera Federación club CD Getafe Femenino and the Cameroon women's national team.

Club career
Manbolamo joined Spanish Primera Nacional club Extremadura UD on 27 September 2019.

International goals
Scores and results list Cameroon's goal tally first

References

External links
Éliane Manbolamo at BDFútbol

1991 births
Living people
Footballers from Yaoundé
Cameroonian women's footballers
Women's association football central defenders
Extremadura UD Femenino players
Cameroon women's international footballers
Cameroonian expatriate women's footballers
Cameroonian expatriate sportspeople in Spain
Expatriate women's footballers in Spain